Come Rain or Come Shine is a musical with book by Carolyn Burns, music by Tim Finn, and lyrics by Tim Finn and Simon Phillips. It is based on Kazuo Ishiguro’s comic short story of the same name.

It was premiered by the Melbourne Theatre Company at the Southbank Theatre from 20 June to 23 July 2022. The production featured Angus Grant (Ray), Gillian Cosgriff (Emily) and Chris Ryan (Charlie).

Reception 
The musical received mixed reviews. Patricia Maunder in Limelight said that "although it doesn’t entirely work, unlike some more toe-tapping musicals for which the pleasure is essentially in the moment, this new offering from Phillips and Finn keeps on tugging at one’s brain and heart after it’s over." Giselle Au-Nhien Nguyen in The Guardian said that "with some moments of great humour and strong performances, it’s an entertaining enough way to spend a couple of hours, if not disappointing given the pedigree of its team." Kate Herbert in The Age concluded the musical was "a courageous, but ultimately unsatisfying show that, with more development, could reach its potential."

References 

2022 musicals
Australian musicals
Musicals based on short fiction
Musicals set in London